

Events

Pre-1600
753 BC – Romulus founds Rome (traditional date).
43 BC – Battle of Mutina: Mark Antony is again defeated in battle by Aulus Hirtius, who is killed. Antony fails to capture Mutina and Decimus Brutus is murdered shortly after.
 900 – The Laguna Copperplate Inscription (the earliest known written document found in what is now the Philippines): the Commander-in-Chief of the Kingdom of Tondo, as represented by the Honourable Jayadewa, Lord Minister of Pailah, pardons from all debt the Honourable Namwaran and his relations.
1092 – The Diocese of Pisa is elevated to the rank of metropolitan archdiocese by Pope Urban II
1506 – The three-day Lisbon Massacre comes to an end with the slaughter of over 1,900 suspected Jews by Portuguese Catholics.
1509 – Henry VIII ascends the throne of England on the death of his father, Henry VII.
1526 – The last ruler of the Lodi dynasty, Ibrahim Lodi is defeated and killed by Babur in the First Battle of Panipat.

1601–1900
1615 – The Wignacourt Aqueduct is inaugurated in Malta.
1782 – The city of Rattanakosin, now known internationally as Bangkok, is founded on the eastern bank of the Chao Phraya River by King Buddha Yodfa Chulaloke.
1789 – John Adams sworn in as 1st US Vice President (nine days before George Washington)
  1789   – George Washington's reception at Trenton is hosted by the Ladies of Trenton as he journeys to New York City for his first inauguration.
1792 – Tiradentes, a revolutionary leading a movement for Brazil's independence, is hanged, drawn and quartered.
1802 – Twelve thousand Wahhabis sack Karbala, killing over three thousand inhabitants.
1806 – Action of 21 April 1806: A French frigate escapes British forces off the coast of South Africa.
1809 – Two Austrian army corps are driven from Landshut by a First French Empire army led by Napoleon as two French corps to the north hold off the main Austrian army on the first day of the Battle of Eckmühl.
1821 – Benderli Ali Pasha arrives in Constantinople as the new Grand Vizier of the Ottoman Empire; he remains in power for only nine days before being sent into exile.
1836 – Texas Revolution: The Battle of San Jacinto: Republic of Texas forces under Sam Houston defeat troops under Mexican General Antonio López de Santa Anna.
1856 – Australian labour movement: Stonemasons and building workers on building sites around Melbourne march from the University of Melbourne to Parliament House to achieve an eight-hour day.
1894 – Norway formally adopts the Krag–Jørgensen bolt-action rifle as the main arm of its armed forces, a weapon that would remain in service for almost 50 years.
1898 – Spanish–American War: The United States Navy begins a blockade of Cuban ports. When the U.S. Congress issued a declaration of war on April 25, it declared that a state of war had existed from this date.

1901–present
1914 – Ypiranga incident: A German arms shipment to Mexico is intercepted by the U.S. Navy near Veracruz.
1918 – World War I: German fighter ace Manfred von Richthofen, better known as "The Red Baron", is shot down and killed over Vaux-sur-Somme in France.
1926 – Al-Baqi cemetery, former site of the mausoleum of four Shi'a Imams, is leveled to the ground by Wahhabis.
1934 – The "Surgeon's Photograph", the most famous photo allegedly showing the Loch Ness Monster, is published in the Daily Mail (in 1994, it is revealed to be a hoax).
1945 – World War II: Soviet forces south of Berlin at Zossen attack the German High Command headquarters.
1948 – United Nations Security Council Resolution 47 relating to Kashmir conflict is adopted.
1952 – Secretary's Day (now Administrative Professionals' Day) is first celebrated.
1958 – United Airlines Flight 736 collides with a United States Air Force fighter jet near Arden, Nevada in what is now Enterprise, Nevada.
1960 – Brasília, Brazil's capital, is officially inaugurated. At 09:30, the Three Powers of the Republic are simultaneously transferred from the old capital, Rio de Janeiro.
1962 – The Seattle World's Fair (Century 21 Exposition) opens. It is the first World's Fair in the United States since World War II.
1963 – The first election of the Universal House of Justice is held, marking its establishment as the supreme governing institution of the Baháʼí Faith.
1964 – A Transit-5bn satellite fails to reach orbit after launch; as it re-enters the atmosphere,  of radioactive plutonium in its SNAP RTG power source is widely dispersed.
1965 – The 1964–1965 New York World's Fair opens for its second and final season.
1966 – Rastafari movement: Haile Selassie of Ethiopia visits Jamaica, an event now celebrated as Grounation Day.
1967 – A few days before the general election in Greece, Colonel George Papadopoulos leads a coup d'état, establishing a military regime that lasts for seven years.
1972 – Astronauts John Young and Charles Duke fly Apollo 16's Apollo Lunar Module to the Moon's surface, the fifth NASA Apollo Program crewed lunar landing.
1975 – Vietnam War: President of South Vietnam Nguyễn Văn Thiệu flees Saigon, as Xuân Lộc, the last South Vietnamese outpost blocking a direct North Vietnamese assault on Saigon, falls.
1977 – Annie opens on Broadway.
1982 – Baseball: Rollie Fingers of the Milwaukee Brewers becomes the first pitcher to record 300 saves.
1985 – The compound of the militant group The Covenant, The Sword, and the Arm of the Lord surrenders to federal authorities in Arkansas after a two-day government siege. 
1987 – The Tamil Tigers are blamed for a car bomb that detonates in the Sri Lankan capital city of Colombo, killing 106 people.
1989 – Tiananmen Square protests of 1989: In Beijing, around 100,000 students gather in Tiananmen Square to commemorate Chinese reform leader Hu Yaobang.
1993 – The Supreme Court in La Paz, Bolivia, sentences former dictator Luis García Meza to 30 years in jail without parole for murder, theft, fraud and violating the constitution.
2004 – Five suicide car bombers target police stations in and around Basra, killing 74 people and wounding 160.
2010 – The controversial Kharkiv Pact (Russian Ukrainian Naval Base for Gas Treaty) is signed in Kharkiv, Ukraine, by Ukrainian President Viktor Yanukovych and Russian President Dmitry Medvedev; it was unilaterally terminated by Russia on March 31, 2014.
2012 – Two trains are involved in a head-on collision near Sloterdijk, Amsterdam, in the Netherlands, injuring 116 people.
2014 – The American city of Flint, Michigan switches its water source to the Flint River, beginning the ongoing Flint water crisis which has caused lead poisoning in up to 12,000 people, and 15 deaths from Legionnaires disease, ultimately leading to criminal indictments against 15 people, five of whom have been charged with involuntary manslaughter.
2019 – Eight bombs explode at churches, hotels, and other locations in Sri Lanka on Easter Sunday; more than 250 people are killed.
2021 – Indonesian Navy submarine KRI Nanggala (402) sinks in the Bali Sea during a military drill, killing all 53 on board.

Births

Pre-1600
1132 – Sancho VI, king of Navarre (d. 1194)
1488 – Ulrich von Hutten, German religious reformer (d. 1523)
1523 – Marco Antonio Bragadin, Venetian lawyer and military officer (d. 1571)
1555 – Ludovico Carracci, Italian painter and etcher (d. 1619)

1601–1900
1619 – Jan van Riebeeck, Dutch founder of Cape Town (d. 1677) 
1630 – Pieter Gerritsz van Roestraten, Dutch-English painter (d. 1700)
1631 – Francesco Maidalchini, Catholic cardinal (d. 1700)
1642 – Simon de la Loubère, French mathematician, poet, and diplomat (d. 1729)
1651 – Joseph Vaz, Sri Lankan priest, missionary, and saint (d. 1711)
1652 – Michel Rolle, French mathematician and academic (d. 1719)
1671 – John Law, Scottish economist (d. 1729)
1673 – Wilhelmine Amalia of Brunswick-Lüneburg (d. 1742)
1713 – Louis de Noailles, French general (d. 1793)
1730 – Antonín Kammel, Czech violinist and composer (d. 1788)
1752 – Pierre-Alexandre-Laurent Forfait, French engineer, hydrographer, and politician, French Minister of Marine and the Colonies (d. 1807)
  1752   – Humphry Repton, English gardener and author (d. 1818)
1774 – Jean-Baptiste Biot, French physicist, astronomer, and mathematician (d. 1862)
1775 – Alexander Anderson, Scottish-American illustrator and engraver (d. 1870)
1783 – Reginald Heber, English priest (d. 1821) ; re-printed 2015 by Facsimile Publisher and distributed by Gyan Books, New Delhi. 
1790 – Manuel Blanco Encalada, Spanish-Chilean admiral and politician, 1st President of Chile (d. 1876)
1810 – John Putnam Chapin, American politician, 10th Mayor of Chicago (d. 1864)
1811 – Alson Sherman, American merchant and politician, 8th Mayor of Chicago (d. 1903)
1814 – Angela Burdett-Coutts, 1st Baroness Burdett-Coutts, English art collector and philanthropist (d. 1906)
1816 – Charlotte Brontë, English novelist and poet (d. 1855)
1837 – Fredrik Bajer, Danish lieutenant and politician, Nobel Prize laureate (d. 1922)
1838 – John Muir, Scottish-American environmentalist and author (d. 1914)
1854 – William Stang, German-American bishop (d. 1907)
1864 – Max Weber, German economist and sociologist (d. 1920)
1868 – Alfred Henry Maurer, American painter (d. 1932)
  1868   – Mary Rogers Miller, American author and educator (d. 1971)
1870 – Edwin Stanton Porter, American director, producer, and screenwriter (d. 1941)
1874 – Vincent Scotto, French composer and actor (d. 1952)
1882 – Percy Williams Bridgman, American physicist and academic, Nobel Prize laureate (d. 1961)
1885 – Tatu Kolehmainen, Finnish runner (d. 1967)
1887 – Joe McCarthy, American baseball manager (d. 1978)
1889 – Marcel Boussac, French businessman (d. 1980) 
  1889   – Paul Karrer, Russian-Swiss chemist and academic, Nobel Prize laureate (d. 1971)
  1889   – Efrem Zimbalist, Sr., Russian-American violinist, composer, and conductor (d. 1985)
1892 – Freddie Dixon, English motorcycle racer and racing driver (d. 1956)
1893 – Romeo Bertini, Italian runner (d. 1973)
1898 – Maurice Wilson, English soldier, pilot, and mountaineer (d. 1934)
1899 – Randall Thompson, American composer and academic (d. 1984)

1901–present
1903 – Luis Saslavsky, Argentinian director, producer, and screenwriter (d. 1995)
1904 – Jean Hélion, French painter (d. 1987)
  1904   – Odilo Globocnik, Italian-Austrian SS officer (d. 1945)
1905 – Pat Brown, American lawyer and politician, 32nd Governor of California (d. 1996)
1911 – Ivan Combe, American businessman, developed Clearasil (d. 2000)
  1911   – Kemal Satır, Turkish physician and politician  (d. 1991)
1912 – Eve Arnold, Russian-American photojournalist (d. 2012)
  1912   – Marcel Camus, French director and screenwriter (d. 1982)
1913 – Norman Parkinson, English photographer (d. 1990)
1914 – Angelo Savoldi, Italian-American wrestler and promoter, co-founded International World Class Championship Wrestling (d. 2013)
1915 – Garrett Hardin, American ecologist, author, and academic (d. 2003)
  1915   – Anthony Quinn, Mexican-American actor (d. 2001)
1916 – Estella B. Diggs, American businesswoman and politician (d. 2013)
1918 – Eddy Christiani, Dutch singer-songwriter and guitarist (d. 2016)
1919 – Don Cornell, American singer (d. 2004)
  1919   – Roger Doucet, Canadian tenor (d. 1981)
  1919   – Licio Gelli, Italian financer (d. 2015)
1922 – Alistair MacLean,  Scottish novelist and screenwriter (d. 1987)
  1922   – Allan Watkins, Welsh-English cricketer (d. 2011)
1923 – John Mortimer, English lawyer and author (d. 2009)
1924 – Ira Louvin, American singer-songwriter and mandolin player (d. 1965)
1925 – Anthony Mason, Australian soldier and judge, 9th Chief Justice of Australia
  1925   – John Swinton of Kimmerghame, English general and politician, Lord Lieutenant of Berwickshire (d. 2018)
1926 – Elizabeth II, Queen of the United Kingdom and her other realms (d. 2022)
  1926   – Arthur Rowley, English footballer, manager and cricketer (d. 2002)
1927 – Ahmed Arif, Turkish poet and author (d. 1991)
1928 – Jack Evans, Welsh-Canadian ice hockey player and coach (d. 1996)
1930 – Hilda Hilst, Brazilian author, poet, and playwright (d. 2004)
  1930   – Silvana Mangano, Italian actress (d. 1989)
  1930   – Dieter Roth, German-Swiss illustrator and sculptor (d. 1998)
  1930   – Jack Taylor, English footballer and referee (d. 2012)
1931 – Morgan Wootten, American high school basketball coach (d. 2020)
1932 – Slide Hampton, African-American trombonist and composer
  1932   – Elaine May, American actress, comedian, director, and screenwriter
  1932   – Angela Mortimer, English tennis player
1933 – Edelmiro Amante, Filipino lawyer and politician (d. 2013)
  1933   – Easley Blackwood, Jr., American pianist, composer, and educator
  1933   – Ignatius Zakka I Iwas, Iraqi patriarch (d. 2014)
1935 – Charles Grodin, American actor and talk show host (d. 2021) 
  1935   – Thomas Kean, American academic and politician, 48th Governor of New Jersey
1936 – James Dobson, American evangelist, psychologist, and author, founded Focus on the Family
  1936   – Reg Fleming, Canadian-American ice hockey player (d. 2009)
1937 – Gary Peters, American baseball player
  1937   – Ben Zinn, Israeli-born American academic and former international soccer player
1939 – John McCabe, English pianist and composer (d. 2015)
  1939   – Sister Helen Prejean, American nun, activist, and author 
  1939   – Reni Santoni, American actor (d. 2020)
1940 – Jacques Caron, Canadian ice hockey player and coach
  1940   – Souleymane Cissé, Malian director, producer, and screenwriter
1941 – David L. Boren, American lawyer and politician, 21st Governor of Oklahoma
1942 – Geoffrey Palmer, New Zealand politician, 33rd Prime Minister of New Zealand
1945 – Srinivasaraghavan Venkataraghavan, Indian cricketer and umpire
  1945   – Mark Wainberg, Canadian researcher and HIV/AIDS activist (d. 2017)
  1945   – Diana Darvey, English actress, singer and dancer (d. 2000)
1947 – Al Bumbry, American baseball player
  1947   – Iggy Pop, American singer-songwriter, producer, and actor
  1947   – John Weider, English bass player 
1948 – Gary Condit, American businessman and politician
  1948   – Paul Davis, American singer-songwriter and musician (d. 2008)
  1948   – Josef Flammer, Swiss ophthalmologist 
  1948   – Dieter Fromm, German runner
1949 – Patti LuPone, American actress and singer
1950 – Shivaji Satam, Indian actor
1951 – Tony Danza, American actor and producer
  1951   – Michael Freedman, American mathematician and academic
  1951   – Bob Varsha, American sportscaster
  1951   – Steve Vickers, Canadian ice hockey player
1952 – Gerald Early, American author and academic
  1952   – Cheryl Gillan, British businesswoman and politician, Secretary of State for Wales (d. 2021)
1953 – John Brumby, Australian politician, 45th Premier of Victoria
1954 – Ebiet G. Ade, Indonesian singer-songwriter and guitarist
  1954   – James Morrison, American actor, director, producer, and screenwriter
1955 – Murathan Mungan, Turkish author, poet, and playwright
1956 – Peter Kosminsky, English director, producer, and screenwriter
  1956   – Phillip Longman, German-American demographer and journalist
1957 – Hervé Le Tellier, French linguist and author
  1957   – Herbert Wetterauer, German painter, sculptor, and author
1958 – Andie MacDowell, American model, actress, and producer
  1958   – Yoshito Usui, Japanese illustrator (d. 2009)
  1958   – Michael Zarnock, American author
1959 – Tim Jacobus, American illustrator and painter
  1959   – Robert Smith, English singer-songwriter and guitarist 
1961 – David Servan-Schreiber, French physician, neuroscientist, and author (d. 2011)
1965 – Fiona Kelleghan, American academic, critic and librarian 
1969 – Toby Stephens, English actor
1971 – Michael Turner, American author and illustrator (d. 2008)
1973 – Steve Backshall, English naturalist, writer, and television presenter 
1977 – Gyula Koi, Hungarian scholar and educator
1979 – Virginie Basselot, French chef
  1979   – James McAvoy, Scottish actor
1980 – Tony Romo, American football player and announcer
1983 – Tarvaris Jackson, American football player (d. 2020)
1988 – Ricky Berens, American swimmer
  1988   – Jencarlos Canela, American singer-songwriter and actor
  1996 – Arianne Hartono, Dutch tennis player

Deaths

Pre-1600
 234 – Emperor Xian of Han, Chinese emperor (b. 181)
 586 – Liuvigild, king of the Visigoths
 847 – Odgar, Frankish archbishop of Mainz
 866 – Bardas, de facto regent of the Byzantine Empire
 941 – Bajkam, de facto regent of the Abbasid Caliphate
1073 – Pope Alexander II
1109 – Anselm of Canterbury, Italian-English archbishop and saint (b. 1033)
1136 – Stephen, Count of Tréguier Breton noblemen (b. c. 1058/62)
1142 – Peter Abelard, French philosopher and theologian (b. 1079)
1213 – Maria of Montpellier, Lady of Montpellier, Queen of Aragon (b. 1182)
1329 – Frederick IV, Duke of Lorraine (b. 1282)
1400 – John Wittlebury, English politician (b. 1333)
1509 – Henry VII of England (b. 1457)
1557 – Petrus Apianus, German mathematician and astronomer (b. 1495)
1574 – Cosimo I de' Medici, Grand Duke of Tuscany (b. 1519)
1591 – Sen no Rikyū, Japanese exponent of the tea ceremony (b. 1522)

1601–1900
1650 – Yagyū Jūbei Mitsuyoshi, Japanese samurai (b. 1607)
1668 – Jan Boeckhorst, Flemish painter (b. c. 1604)
1699 – Jean Racine, French playwright and poet (b. 1639)
1719 – Philippe de La Hire, French mathematician and astronomer (b. 1640)
1720 – Antoine Hamilton, Irish-French soldier and author (b. 1646)
1722 – Robert Beverley, Jr., English historian and author (b. 1673)
1736 – Prince Eugene of Savoy (b. 1663)
1740 – Thomas Tickell, English poet and author (b. 1685)
1758 – Francesco Zerafa, Maltese architect (b. 1679)
1815 – Joseph Winston, American soldier and politician (b. 1746)
1825 – Johann Friedrich Pfaff, German mathematician and academic (b. 1765)
1852 – Ivan Nabokov, Russian general (b. 1787)
1863 – Sir Robert Bateson, 1st Baronet, Irish politician (b. 1782)
1900 – Vikramatji Khimojiraj, Indian ruler (b. 1819)

1901–present
1910 – Mark Twain, American novelist, humorist, and critic (b. 1835)
1918 – Manfred von Richthofen, German captain and pilot (b. 1892)
1924 – Eleonora Duse, Italian actress (b. 1858)
1930 – Robert Bridges, English poet and author (b. 1844)
1932 – Friedrich Gustav Piffl, Bohemian cardinal (b. 1864)
1938 – Allama Muhammad Iqbal, Pakistani National philosopher and poet (b. 1877)
1941 – Fritz Manteuffel, German gymnast (b. 1875)
1945 – Walter Model, German field marshal (b. 1891)
1946 – John Maynard Keynes, English economist and philosopher (b. 1883)
1948 – Aldo Leopold, American ecologist and author (b. 1887)
1952 – Leslie Banks, American actor, director and producer (b. 1890)
1954 – Emil Leon Post, Polish-American mathematician and logician (b. 1897)
1956 – Charles MacArthur, American playwright and screenwriter (b. 1895)
1965 – Edward Victor Appleton, English-Scottish physicist and academic, Nobel Prize laureate (b. 1892)
1971 – François Duvalier, Haitian physician and politician, 40th President of Haiti (b. 1907)
1973 – Arthur Fadden, Australian accountant and politician, 13th Prime Minister of Australia (b. 1894)
  1973   – Kemal Tahir, Turkish journalist and author (b. 1910)
1977 – Gummo Marx, American vaudevillian and talent agent (b. 1893)
1978 – Sandy Denny, English singer-songwriter (b. 1947)
  1978   – Thomas Wyatt Turner, American biologist and academic (b. 1877)
1980 – Alexander Oparin, Russian biochemist and academic (b. 1894)
  1980   – Sohrab Sepehri, Iranian poet and painter (b. 1928)
1983 – Walter Slezak, Austrian-American actor and singer (b. 1902)
1984 – Marcel Janco, Romanian-Israeli artist (b. 1895)
  1984   – Hristo Prodanov, Bulgarian engineer and mountaineer (b. 1943)
1985 – Rudi Gernreich, Austrian-American fashion designer, created the monokini (b. 1922)
  1985   – Tancredo Neves, Brazilian banker and politician, Prime Minister of Brazil (b. 1910)
1986 – Marjorie Eaton, American painter and actress (b. 1901)
  1986   – Salah Jahin, Egyptian poet, playwright, and composer (b. 1930)
1987 – Gustav Bergmann, Austrian-American philosopher from the Vienna Circle (b. 1906)
1990 – Erté, Russian-French illustrator (b. 1892)
1991 – Willi Boskovsky, Austrian violinist and conductor (b. 1909)
1992 – Väinö Linna, Finnish author (b. 1920)
1996 – Abdul Hafeez Kardar, Pakistani cricketer (b. 1925)
  1996   – Jimmy Snyder, American sportscaster (b. 1919)
1998 – Jean-François Lyotard, French sociologist and philosopher (b. 1924)
1999 – Buddy Rogers, American actor (b. 1904)
2003 – Nina Simone, American singer-songwriter, pianist, and activist (b. 1933)
2010 – Gustav Lorentzen, Norwegian singer-songwriter and guitarist (b. 1947)
  2010   – Juan Antonio Samaranch, Spanish businessman, seventh President of the International Olympic Committee (b. 1920)
  2010   – Kanagaratnam Sriskandan, Sri Lankan-English engineer and civil servant (b. 1930)
2011 – Catharina Halkes, Dutch theologian and academic (b. 1920)
2012 – Doris Betts, American author and academic (b. 1932)
2013 – Shakuntala Devi, Indian mathematician and astrologer (b. 1929)
  2013   – Leopold Engleitner, Austrian Holocaust survivor, author, and educator (b. 1905)
2014 – George H. Heilmeier, American engineer (b. 1936)
  2014   – Win Tin, Burmese journalist and politician, co-founded the National League for Democracy (b. 1930)
2016 – Prince, American singer-songwriter, guitarist, producer, and actor (b. 1958)
2017 – Ugo Ehiogu, English footballer (b. 1972)
2018 – Nabi Tajima, Japanese supercentenarian (b. 1900)
2019 – Polly Higgins, Scottish barrister, author and environmental lobbyist (b. 1968)

Holidays and observances
 Christian feast day:
Abdecalas
Anastasius Sinaita
Anselm of Canterbury
Beuno
Conrad of Parzham
Holy Infant of Good Health
Shemon Bar Sabbae
Wolbodo
April 21 (Eastern Orthodox liturgics)
Civil Service Day (India)
Grounation Day (Rastafari)
Heroic Defense of Veracruz (Mexico)
Kang Pan-sok's Birthday (North Korea)
Kartini Day (Indonesia)
Local Self Government Day (Russia)
National Tea Day (United Kingdom)
National Tree Planting Day (Kenya)
San Jacinto Day (Texas)
Queen or King's Official Birthday (Falkland Islands)
Tiradentes' Day (Brazil)
Vietnam Book Day (Vietnam)

References

Sources

External links

 BBC: On This Day
 
 Historical Events on April 21

Days of the year
April